No Activity is an American comedy television series, based on the Australian series of the same name created by Trent O'Donnell, that premiered on November 12, 2017, on CBS All Access. The series was developed by O'Donnell and Patrick Brammall, both of whom executive produce alongside Will Ferrell, Adam McKay, Joe Farrell, Jason Burrows, and Joe Hardesty. In February 2018, it was announced that the series had been renewed for a second season, which premiered on November 22, 2018. In March 2019, CBS All Access renewed the series for a third season which premiered on November 21, 2019.

In October 2020, the series was renewed for a fourth season, in which the series switched to a computer animation format. The season premiered on April 8, 2021. In January 2023, the series was removed from Paramount+.

Premise
No Activitys first series is "set against the world of a major drug cartel bust" and follows "two low-level cops who have spent far too much time in a car together; two criminals who are largely kept in the dark; two dispatch workers who haven’t really clicked; and two Mexican tunnelers who are in way too small a space considering they’ve only just met."

The second and third series juxtapose the double parings, the pair of cops, and a pair of criminals - as well as expanding on the relationships within the dispatch center. In the second series, the El Chapo connection acquires an over exuberant FBI agent involved in the case, and his perspective on matters. Cameos are more frequent.

The third series revolves around the demoted officers, from detectives to patrol, and the cleanup of the El Chapo events and the FBI agent. The patrol car features more cameos, and there is a general resistance to robotic replacements introduced to the dispatch center and other areas of life.

Cast and characters

Main
 Patrick Brammall as Nick Cullen, a police detective
 Tim Meadows as Judd Tolbeck, a police detective
 Amy Sedaris as Janice Delongpre, a dispatch officer
 Sunita Mani as Fatima Khorasani, a dispatch officer
 Jesse Plemons as Angus (season 1)
 Jason Mantzoukas as Dustin Kasprowicz, an undercover FBI agent who goes by the name Marco
 Arturo Castro as Miguel (season 1)
 Adrian Martinez as Roberto (season 1)
 Cristin Milioti as Frankie (season 2)
 Dylan McDermott as Clint Bergman (season 3)
 George Basil as Gary (season 3)
 Angus Sampson as Chief (season 3)

Recurring
 Will Ferrell as Adrian
 Nina Pedrad as Helen
 Bob Odenkirk as Greg, a port security officer
 Darren Gilshenan as Tony
 Chris Gethard as Zach Ataque, a dispatch officer
 Matt Walsh as Larry Turnbull
 Jack Axelrod as Steve
 Alexandra Rodriguez as Gabriella
 Jake Johnson as Josh Haldeman, a special agent for the DEA
 J. K. Simmons as Leon Fordham, an internal affairs senior detective
 John Leary
 Max Greenfield as Cotric
 Joe Manganiello as Dugan
 Keegan-Michael Key as Charles Brock
 Joe Keery as Officer Ed Reinhardt

Guest
 Mackenzie Davis as Pat the Rat ("The Metric System")
 Bridget Everett as Bonnie Lehman ("Golden Age of Tunnels"), a special agent for the DEA
 Michaela Watkins as Erin Saunders ("Golden Age of Tunnels"), an internal affairs detective
 Courtenay Taylor as Officer Eastman ("The Raid")
 Jessica Alba as The Actress ("The Actress")
 Harriet Dyer as Hazel ("The Actress")
 Nasim Pedrad ("Honesty & Action")
 Allison Bell as Leary ("Honesty & Action")
 Amy Schumer as herself ("Tooth and Nail")

Episodes

Season 1 (2017)

Season 2 (2018)

Season 3 (2019)

Season 4 (2021)

Production

Development
On August 1, 2017, it was announced that CBS All Access had given the production, an American adaptation of the Australian television series No Activity, a series order. Executive producers were expected to include Will Ferrell, Adam McKay, Patrick Brammall, Trent O'Donnell, Jason Burrows and Joe Farrell. Production companies involved with the series were slated to consist of CBS Television Studios, Gary Sanchez Productions, and Funny Or Die. On October 4, 2017, it was announced that the series would premiere on November 12, 2017.

On February 13, 2018, it was announced that the series had been renewed for a second season. On September 25, 2018, it was announced that the second season would be released all at once on November 22, 2018.

On March 3, 2019, it was reported that the series had been renewed for a third season. On October 15, 2019, it was announced that the third season would premiere on November 21, 2019. On October 29, 2020, CBS All Access renewed the series for a fourth season, with the season being animated rather than live-action, during the set on COVID-19 pandemic.

Casting
Alongside the series premiere announcement, it was confirmed that the series would star Patrick Brammall and Tim Meadows with guest stars including Will Ferrell, Mark Berry, Arturo Castro, Mackenzie Davis, Bridget Everett, Darren Gilshenan, Travis Guba, Jake Johnson, Sunita Mani, Jason Mantzoukas, Adrian Martinez, Jesse Plemons, Fred Pohl, Alex Rodriguez, Amy Sedaris, J. K. Simmons, Courtenay Taylor, Michaela Watkins, and Daniel Zolghadri.

Release
On October 4, 2017, a teaser trailer for the first season was released. On October 30, 2017, the official trailer for season one was released. On November 12, 2018, the official trailer and key art for season two were released.

Showcase (Canadian TV channel) picked up the show and broadcast season 1 in autumn 2020.

Reception
The first season was met with a mixed reception from critics upon its premiere. On the review aggregation website Rotten Tomatoes, the first season holds a 70% approval rating, with an average rating of 5.58 out of 10 based on 10 reviews. The website's critical consensus reads, "No Activity feels refreshingly slapdash and agreeably aimless for a cop comedy, welcoming viewers to bask in its gentle mirth – though its hook may be less than satisfying for some viewers." Metacritic, which uses a weighted average, assigned the season a score of 56 out of 100 based on 5 reviews, indicating "mixed or average reviews".

In a positive review, The Guardians Luke Buckmaster gave the series a rating of 3 out of 5 stars saying, "No Activity plays in minor key, a reminder of some of comedy’s essential ingredients. Shticks combine irreverence with mundanity, there is generous give and take between performers, and it shows an appreciation of incongruity in various iterations."

See also
 Nothing to Report

References

External links

2010s American police comedy television series
2020s American police comedy television series
2017 American television series debuts
2021 American television series endings
American television series based on Australian television series
Paramount+ original programming
English-language television shows
Television series by Funny or Die
Television series by Gary Sanchez Productions
Television series by CBS Studios
Television shows set in San Diego